Ryan Avery (born June 27, 1982) is a Canadian former professional indoor lacrosse goaltender. He was born in Hamilton, Ontario, and played for the Buffalo Bandits and Calgary Roughnecks in the National Lacrosse League.

Avery participated in a Guinness world record-setting longest lacrosse game that lasted 24 hours, helping raise money for Right To Play.

References

1982 births
Living people
Buffalo Bandits players
Calgary Roughnecks players
Canadian lacrosse players
Lacrosse goaltenders
Lacrosse people from Ontario
Sportspeople from Hamilton, Ontario